Loxocera albiseta  is a species of fly in the family Psilidae. It is found in the  Palearctic.

References

Psilidae
Insects described in 1803
Taxa named by Franz von Paula Schrank
Muscomorph flies of Europe